Durban Girls' College is an independent boarding and day school for girls, with weekly boarding facilities for high school pupils, located on the Berea, overlooking the city of Durban in KwaZulu-Natal, South Africa.

Notable alumnae

Lara Logan, television journalist for Fox News
Claire Palley, academic and lawyer
Professor Elizabeth Sneddon, playwright
Khanyi Dhlomo, South African TV Host and the founder and CEO of Ndalo Media and Ndalo Luxury Ventures
Tarina Patel, Actress, model, film producer
Kirsten Goss, jewellery designer
June Drummond, author of crime novels
Renée Schuurman, tennis player

College anthem
The college anthem is All Hail the College Galleon, composed by old girl, June Drummond in 1940.

References

External links
 
 

1877 establishments in the Colony of Natal
Anglican schools in South Africa
Boarding schools in South Africa
Educational institutions established in 1877
Girls' schools in South Africa
Private schools in KwaZulu-Natal